Oryzaephilus is a genus of beetles in the family Silvanidae, containing 16 species:

 Oryzaephilus abeillei Guillebeau
 Oryzaephilus acuminatus Halstead
 Oryzaephilus breuningi Halstead
 Oryzaephilus canus Halstead
 Oryzaephilus cuneatus Halstead
 Oryzaephilus decellei Halstead
 Oryzaephilus exiguus Halstead
 Oryzaephilus fauveli Reitter
 Oryzaephilus genalis Halstead
 Oryzaephilus gibbosus Aitken
 Oryzaephilus mercator Fauvel
 Oryzaephilus mucronatus Halstead
 Oryzaephilus parallelus Halstead
 Oryzaephilus serratus Halstead
 Oryzaephilus socotraensis Halstead
 Oryzaephilus surinamensis Linnaeus

References

Silvanidae genera